Oaksterdam University is self-recognized as the world's first cannabis college. Located in Oakland, CA, the educational facility was founded in November 2007 by medical marijuana activist Richard Lee to offer quality training for the cannabis industry, with a mission to "legitimize the business and work to change the law to make cannabis legal." Its main campus was formerly located in Downtown Oakland, Calif. On March 8, 2020, fire damaged the Oaksterdam campus at which time the brick and mortar location closed. Classes are currently held online only, both asynchronous and in real time. The university has graduated nearly 50,000 students from more than 40 countries.

History
The stage for Oaksterdam University's eventual founding was set in 1995, when Jeff Jones co-founded the Oakland Cannabis Buyers' Cooperative, a bike service delivering cannabis to medical necessity patients, in Oakland, Calif. Grower Richard Lee, of Houston, Tex., supplied the OCBC with consistent quality cannabis, driving prices down. In July, 1996, the City of Oakland passed a Resolution of Support for OCBC, and Jones opened the first medical cannabis dispensary permitted by city government, located at 1755 Broadway. That same year, Proposition 215 passed in California, making the possession and cultivation of medical cannabis legal by state law. 

In 1997, Lee moved to Oakland and co-founded Hemp Research Company. Oakland City Council formed a "working group" to clarify the medical use of cannabis and the city's role in enforcing drug laws. Jones and Attorney Robert Reich educated the Oakland Police Department and introduced the idea of cannabis being the lowest law enforcement priority. In 2000, what had begun as a District Court case against Jeff Jones went all the way to the U.S. Supreme Court. In United States v. Oakland Cannabis Buyers Cooperative, OCBC argued for the right to manufacture and distribute marijuana for medical patients. They lost, but the momentum for legalization continued to build. 

In 2003, Lee opened Coffeeshop SR-17, which would later become Coffeeshop Blue Sky, joining other medical cannabis dispensaries that had cropped up in the now cannabis-friendly town, creating momentum for the cannabis movement, as well as the revitalization of the city. 

Activist Lee later said he was inspired to create Oaksterdam University after visiting the Cannabis College in Amsterdam. Lee recalled:

Lee placed an ad in the East Bay Express that read: "Cannabis Industry, Now Hiring." In the first week, he received more than 200 calls, and Oaksterdam University was born. The university offered its first classes to 22 students in November, 2007. They were taught horticulture, cooking, extracts, legal issues, and successful law enforcement encounters, plus politics and history, from top minds in the cannabis movement, including Jeff Jones, Chris Conrad, Attorney Lawrence Lichter, Dennis Peron, and Lee himself. Oaksterdam University would become "ground zero" of the international cannabis reform movement.

Demand for classes grew quickly and waiting lists were months-long. Dale Sky Jones joined Oaksterdam's staff as science instructor in February, 2008, and was determined to add satellite schools across the country, starting with the first in Los Angeles, a second in Ann Arbor, Mich. and a third in Sebastopol, Calif. 

By November, 2009, two years after the school's inception, the Oakland campus at 1600 Broadway was renovated to meet demand. The new 30,000-square-foot school included multiple classrooms, an auditorium, a hands-on grow lab, a theater, and a 10,000-square-foot basement nursery full of cannabis plants.

In 2009, the City of Oakland Marijuana Tax Measure F passed, making Oakland, California the first city in the country to assess a tax on medical cannabis clubs and dispensaries. Oaksterdam welcomed thousands of students from around the world, contributing to revitalization of the neighborhood.

In addition to educating students, Oaksterdam University leaders were activists in the legalization movement, beginning with California Proposition 19 in 2010. Lee spent $1.3 million, including profits from OU, to get the initiative on the ballot. While Prop 19 failed, the campaign became a blueprint for the cannabis legalization movement in California and subsequent states.

OU faculty helped write California's Proposition 215 Medical Marijuana Initiative (1996); 1996 California Senate Bill 420, also known as the Compassionate Care Act; 2016 California Proposition 64; and multiple state ballot initiatives. Faculty continue to advise on the legislation and regulation of cannabis by local, state, and international governments and agencies.

Raid

On April 2, 2012, Oaksterdam University was raided by the IRS, accompanied by the DEA and US Marshals Service. The raid additionally targeted Coffeeshop Blue Sky and the Oaksterdam museum, both affiliated with Oaksterdam University.  A number of the university's assets were seized, including plants, records, computers, and bank accounts.

Due to the city of Oakland's support of the university, the Oakland Police Department was not informed of the raid. Subsequently, on the same day, there was a shooting in a nearby school, and the Oakland Police Dept. wasn't prepared to handle the numerous protestors (which included city council members) and respond to the shooting in time. Oaksterdam University continued to put on classes less than 48 hours later. Incorrect reports often cite that the event was conducted by the DEA. Although the university was only one of many businesses under the corporate umbrella subject to the investigation, it was the Oaksterdam University name that was mentioned in the news due to its on-air and international recognition. No charges have been filed. Richard Lee retired, dissolving his interest in his businesses, paving the way for a new generation of leadership.

After the raid, Oaksterdam University officials stated that they would immediately reopen. Founder Richard Lee said he would be giving up ownership of the organization, citing mounting debt and concern for incurring federal charges. Dale Sky Jones took over the school as Executive Chancellor and OU's practice of growing plants on site came to an end. School officials continued to teach classes.

Curriculum
The university's curriculum reaches all aspects of the medical marijuana industry, including horticulture, business management, budtending, law, politics, history, civics, economics, manufacturing, extraction, advocacy, CBD, hemp, pain management, and more.

The school has two main programs, Live and Self-Paced.  

Certificates are awarded upon completing classes, but the university cannot get accreditation because cannabis is classified as a Schedule I drug.

Notable faculty
 Dale Sky Jones – executive chancellor
 Ed Rosenthal – author of books on cannabis horticulture
 Richard Lee – founder of Oaksterdam University, proponent of California's Proposition 19 (2010)
 Chris Conrad – author of cannabis history and industrial hemp
Paul Armentano — executive director of NORML
Bruce Margolin — cannabis defense attorney
Joey Ereñeta
Kyle Kushman
Dave McCullick
Sandy Moriarty — author of Aunt Sandy's Medical Marijuana Cookbook
Michael "Big Mike" Parker
Natalie Darves, dean of faculty, founder, Cougar Acres Consulting

Opposition
Opposition to the university has been shown by the Drug Enforcement Administration, which claims the school "sends the wrong message in the country's fight against drugs and promotes criminal activity." Opinion has since changed. More doctors including U.S. surgeon general Vivek Murthy said that marijuana can be helpful, Retired DEA Administrative Law Judge Francis L. Young stated "The evidence in this record [9-6-88 ruling] clearly shows that marijuana has been accepted as capable of relieving the distress of great numbers of very ill people and doing so with safety under medical supervision. It would be unreasonable, arbitrary and capricious for DEA to continue to stand between those sufferers and the benefits of this substance in light of the evidence in this record."

The ongoing legal risk to the university has also recently shifted in light of federal guidance released by the Cole Memorandum on August 29, 2013, which de-emphasized federal prosecutions of cannabis businesses in states which had legalized the drug for medical or other adult use. 

Now, agencies turn to Oaksterdam University to help them create a taxable, regulated, and safe cannabis industry within their communities. Oaksterdam University also provides technical assistance to the cities of Los Angeles, San Francisco and Palm Springs.

In media
Oaksterdam University has been featured in worldwide press articles as an organization on the forefront of the cannabis legalization movement and expert source on cannabis business, horticulture, science and medicine. 

Oaksterdam is featured in the TV movie Going to Pot: The Highs and Lows of It. 

Oaksterdam University is the subject of the 2012 documentary California, 90420.

Dale Sky Jones and Oaksterdam are featured in the 2017 documentary The Legend of 420

Oaksterdam University is the subject of the 2014 documentaries Legalize It and Let Timmy Smoke

Oaksterdam was featured in a  2014 episode of 10 Things You Don’t Know About

Oaksterdam University was part of the 2013 video short Clippin’ the Buds: Medical Marijuana and the Marijuana Pill.

The 2010 TV movie documentary Marijuana: A Chronic History featured OU.

Oaksterdam is the primary focus of the upcoming documentary American Pot Story.

Dale Sky Jones was an expert consultant for HBO’s Weeds.

References

Further reading

External links
 
 Oakland's Oaksterdam University offers education in marijuana KRON-TV San Francisco, September 15, 2016

 
Education in Oakland, California
Universities and colleges in Alameda County, California
Educational institutions established in 2007
For-profit universities and colleges in the United States
Medicinal use of cannabis organizations based in the United States
Unaccredited institutions of higher learning in California
Cannabis in California
2007 in cannabis
Private universities and colleges in California
2007 establishments in California